The following is an incomplete list of historical buildings and structures in Macau.

15th century

16th century

17th century

18th century

19th century

20th century

References

 Macauheritage.net: Macau Heritage historic sites

H
.
Macau architecture
.
Macau historic buildings
Landmarks in Macau
Social history of Macau